Obrosovo is a rural locality (a village) and the administrative center of Borovetskoye Rural Settlement, Sokolsky District, Vologda Oblast, Russia. The population was 328 as of 2002. There are 2 streets.

Geography 
Obrosovo is located 10 km northwest of Sokol (the district's administrative centre) by road. Bolshoy Dvor is the nearest rural locality.

References 

Rural localities in Sokolsky District, Vologda Oblast